Miss República Dominicana 2003 was held on July 29, 2002. There were 22 candidates, representing provinces and municipalities, who entered. There was going to be 30 but there were various withdrawals. The winner would represent the Dominican Republic at Miss Universe 2003. The first runner-up would enter Miss International 2003. The second runner-up would enter in Miss América Latina 2003. The rest of finalist entered different pageants. The winner of the pageant would go to win the crown of Miss Universe, that is the reason she didn't enter Miss Earth.

Results

Delegates

Withdrawals
Miss Neiba and Miss Santiago Rodriguez both withdrew after having had an accident before the photoshoot. They had to wear 9 inch high heels due to a reward challenge they had on the first day. Miss Neiba twisted her ankle and Miss Santiago Rodriquez twisted her kneecap. They were both in the auditorium 2 months later, the evening of the coronation.
Miss Dajabón, Miss Hato Mayor, Miss San Cristóbal, Miss San Juan, Miss Villa Bisonó and Miss Villa González entered the pageant, but withdrew weeks before the finale.

External links
http://dr1.com/news/2002/dnews073002.shtml
http://dr1.com/news/2002/dnews072902.shtml Dr1

Miss Dominican Republic
2002 beauty pageants
2002 in the Dominican Republic